The 1967–68 Los Angeles Kings season was the first season for the Kings in the National Hockey League. The Kings qualified for the Stanley Cup playoffs but lost in their first playoff series.

Offseason
The Kings were one of six expansion teams, which doubled the size of the league from six to twelve. While the expected favorite bid in Los Angeles was by Dan Reeves, owner of the Western Hockey League's Los Angeles Blades and the NFL's Los Angeles Rams, the league instead awarded a franchise to Jack Kent Cooke, a Canadian who also owned the National Basketball Association's Los Angeles Lakers. The Kings were placed in the newly established West Division, along with the other expansion teams: the California Seals, Minnesota North Stars, Philadelphia Flyers, Pittsburgh Penguins and St. Louis Blues.

Prior to the 1967 NHL Expansion Draft, Cooke arranged a deal with Toronto Maple Leafs left wing Red Kelly, who as a player holds the distinction of playing on the most Stanley Cup championship teams without any of them including time in Montreal, and was set for his retirement, to become the Kings' first head coach. During the draft, the Kings picked goaltenders Terry Sawchuk and Wayne Rutledge with their first picks, and once Maple Leafs' general manager Punch Imlach decided to put Kelly on the protected list on the tenth round, Cooke was forced to send one of his picks, Ken Block, in exchange for his future coach. To not rely only on the draft, Cooke purchased the American Hockey League's Springfield Indians for $1 million to bolster the Kings roster. Long-time Indians player Brian Kilrea would score the Kings' first goal.

Cooke invested heavily on promoting his team, inviting Hollywood stars to the arena, and creating nicknames for most players which he enforced play-by-play announcer Jiggs McDonald to employ in broadcasts. Still, conditions were chaotic. For the first preseason practice in California, The Smothers Brothers Comedy Hour producer Saul Ilson had to bring a puck from his Hollywood office for the Kings to play, as the team's own were unreachable in storage.

Regular season
The Kings played their home games in three locations during that inaugural campaign. Before the brand new arena built by Cooke and known as The Forum would become their permanent home, the team played their first two games at the Long Beach Arena, and 14 more at the Los Angeles Memorial Sports Arena .  The season opener was against fellow expansion Philadelphia Flyers, a 4-2 victory in Long Beach. While the Inglewood arena was being finished, the Kings struggled to attract consistent crowds, with sellouts only when the "Original Six" visited. The team still played well, only losing on the sixth game, and in the previous one winning their first confrontation against an Original Six team when visiting the Chicago Black Hawks.

The Forum was opened on December 30, and in the Kings' first game ever there, they lost 2–0 to the Philadelphia Flyers, to their largest crowd that far of 14,366 spectators. Given that aside from California Seals the closest team from Los Angeles were the St. Louis Blues, the Kings had to endure long road trips for away games. A new arena led to bigger and more consistent crowds, with the average of 6,045 tickets in the first 16 games rising to 9,725 at the Forum, for combined totals of 8,037 across the 37 home games. Original Six teams still brought larger audiences, with an average of 12,560 fans compared to the 7,432 when receiving fellow expansion teams. The Kings were predicted by writers to finish last in the new West Division. Surprisingly, the Kings finished second, just one point behind the Flyers. The division lead was taken by the Kings with four games remaining once they beat Philadelphia at The Forum, but Los Angeles slipped down one position by failing to win the final three games. The Kings had the best record of any of the expansion teams against the "Original Six", going a respectable 10–12–2, including winning their first two games ever against the legendary Montreal Canadiens. The home record of the Kings was 20–13–4 in their 37 home games spread over 3 arenas. On the road, Los Angeles posted a record of just 11–20–6.

The goaltending tandem of future hall of famer Terry Sawchuk and Wayne Rutledge allowed the team to stay in most games. The roster invested heavily on depth, with eight players having at least 25 points, and four scoring at least 18 goals. The leaders were Bill Flett, who scored 26 goals, while Eddie Joyal scored 23 goals, adding 34 assists for 57 points and was the second leading scorer in the West Division. Defenseman Bill White had  11 goals and 38 points, and had the second most penalty minutes with 100, just one behind Dave Amadio.

Playoffs
The Kings faced off against the Minnesota North Stars in their first-ever playoff series. Although the Kings had home-ice advantage, the North Stars won the best-of-seven series 4–3. Los Angeles got the first two games at the Forum, lost twice in Minnesota, and had a close 3-2 victory on Game 5 to retain the lead. Afterwards, the North Stars won in overtime to force a Game 6, and dominated Game 7 at the Forum with a 9-4. Doug Robinson and Lowell MacDonald led all Kings playoff scorers with seven points, while Eddie Joyal and Gord Labossiere had five points each.

Season standings

Record vs. opponents

Schedule and results

|- align="center"
| 1 || 14 || Philadelphia Flyers || 4–2 || Long Beach (7,023) || 1–0-0 
|- align="center"
| 2 || 15 || Minnesota North Stars || 5–3 || Long Beach (4,289) || 2–0-0
|- align="center"
| 3 || 18 || Oakland Seals || 2–2 || Oakland (3,419) || 2-0–1
|- align="center"
| 4 || 21 || St. Louis Blues || 3–3 || St. Louis (7,127)|| 2-0–2
|- align="center"
| 5 || 22 || Chicago Black Hawks || 5–3 || Chicago  (16,666) || 3–0-2
|- align="center"
| 6 || 25 || Toronto Maple Leafs || 2–4 || Toronto (15,698)|| 3–1–2
|- align="center"
| 7 || 26 || Boston Bruins || 0–2 || Boston (12,973)|| 3–2–2
|- align="center"
| 8 || 28 || Pittsburgh Penguins || 5–3 || Pittsburgh (6,536) || 4–2-2
|- align="center"
| 9 || 31 || New York Rangers || 1–6 || Memorial Sports Arena (6,455) || 4–3–2
|-

|- align="center"
| 10 || 2 || Chicago Black Hawks || 1–3 || Memorial Sports Arena (8,012) || 4–4–2
|- align="center"
| 11 || 4 || Minnesota North Stars || 2–2 || Minnesota (10,246) || 4-4–3
|- align="center"
| 12 || 5 || Detroit Red Wings || 6–4 || Detroit (12,164) || 5–4-3
|- align="center"
| 13 || 7 || Oakland Seals || 5–4 || Memorial Sports Arena (5,194) || 6–4-3
|- align="center"
| 14 || 9 || Toronto Maple Leafs || 4–1 || Memorial Sports Arena (9,604) || 7–4-3
|- align="center"
| 15 || 15 || Oakland Seals || 1–4 || Oakland (3,256) || 7–5–3
|- align="center"
| 16 || 17 || Detroit Red Wings || 1–4 || Memorial Sports Arena (9,498) || 7–6–3
|- align="center"
| 17 || 19 || Montreal Canadiens || 4–2 || Memorial Sports Arena (9,849) || 8–6-3
|- align="center"
| 18 || 22 || Oakland Seals || 3–1 || Memorial Sports Arena (5,301) || 9–6-3
|- align="center"
| 19 || 24 || Pittsburgh Penguins || 5–3 || Memorial Sports Arena (6,458) || 10–6-3
|- align="center"
| 20 || 26 || Philadelphia Flyers || 2–7 || Philadelphia (11,420) || 10–7–3
|- align="center"
| 21 || 29 || St. Louis Blues || 2–3 || St. Louis (5,583) || 10–8–3
|-

|- align="center"
| 22 || 2 || Montreal Canadiens || 3–2 || Montreal (14,584) || 11–8-3
|- align="center"
| 23 || 3 || New York Rangers || 2–4 || New York (14,012) || 11–9–3
|- align="center"
| 24 || 6 || St. Louis Blues || 3–2 || Long Beach (4,323)  || 12–9-3
|- align="center"
| 25 || 8 || Philadelphia Flyers || 0–3 || Long Beach (4,624) || 12–10–3
|- align="center"
| 26 || 10 || Boston Bruins || 3–1 || Boston (13,409) || 13–10-3
|- align="center"
| 27 || 13 || Minnesota North Stars || 0–4 || Minnesota (7,749) || 13–11–3
|- align="center"
| 28 || 15 || Minnesota North Stars || 0–3 || Long Beach (7,149) || 13–12–3
|- align="center"
| 29 || 16 || Boston Bruins || 2–5 || Long Beach (6,510) || 13–13–3
|- align="center"
| 30 || 19 || Oakland Seals || 3–1 || Memorial Sports Arena (4,505) || 14–13-3
|- align="center"
| 31 || 21 || Pittsburgh Penguins || 4–1 || Memorial Sports Arena (4,013) || 15–13-3
|- align="center"
| 32 || 23 || St. Louis Blues || 4–0 || Memorial Sports Arena (4,447) || 16–13-3
|- align="center"
| 33 || 25 || Pittsburgh Penguins || 3–4 || Pittsburgh (4,002) || 16–14–3
|- align="center"
| 34 || 27 || St. Louis Blues || 2–4 || St. Louis || 16–15–3
|- align="center"
| 35 || 30 || Philadelphia Flyers || 0–2 || The Forum (14,366) || 16–16–3
|- align="center"
| 36 || 31 || Philadelphia Flyers || 1–9 || Philadelphia (5,643) || 16–17–3
|-

|- align="center"
| 37 || 3 || Minnesota North Stars || 0–6 || Minnesota (9,921) || 16–18–3
|- align="center"
| 38 || 4 || Pittsburgh Penguins || 3–4 || Pittsburgh (4,202)|| 16–19–3
|- align="center"
| 39 || 6 || St. Louis Blues || 1–2 || St. Louis (7,186) || 16–20–3
|- align="center"
| 40 || 7 || Oakland Seals || 0–6 || Oakland (4,577) || 16–21–3
|- align="center"
| 41 || 11 || St. Louis Blues || 2–2 || The Forum (6,894) || 16-21–4
|- align="center"
| 42 || 18 || Pittsburgh Penguins || 3–2 || The Forum (5,755) || 17–21-4
|- align="center"
| 43 || 19 || New York Rangers || 5–2 || The Forum (11,740)|| 18–21-4
|- align="center"
| 44 || 21 || Oakland Seals || 0–3 || Oakland (3,650) || 18–22–4
|- align="center"
| 45 || 24 || Oakland Seals || 1–4 || The Forum (7,553)|| 18–23–4
|- align="center"
| 46 || 27 || Pittsburgh Penguins || 5–3 || Pittsburgh (11,156) || 19–23-4
|- align="center"
| 47 || 28 || Philadelphia Flyers || 2–0 || Philadelphia (13,577) || 20–23-4
|- align="center"
| 48 || 31 || Minnesota North Stars || 1–6 || Minnesota (10,751) || 20–24–4
|-

|- align="center"
| 49 || 1 || Detroit Red Wings || 8–6 || Detroit (10,257) || 21–24-4
|- align="center"
| 50 || 3 || Montreal Canadiens || 1–5 || Montreal (15,343) || 21–25–4
|- align="center"
| 51 || 4 || Chicago Black Hawks || 3–5 || Chicago (16,666) || 21–26–4
|- align="center"
| 52 || 7 || Minnesota North Stars || 2–4 || The Forum (7,120)|| 21–27–4
|- align="center"
| 53 || 8 || Pittsburgh Penguins || 3–1 || The Forum (6,195) || 22–27-4
|- align="center"
| 54 || 12 || Toronto Maple Leafs || 2–0 || The Forum (12,397)|| 23–27-4
|- align="center"
| 55 || 14 || St. Louis Blues || 2–2 || St. Louis (7,652)|| 23-27–5
|- align="center"
| 56 || 16 || Philadelphia Flyers || 7–1 || The Forum (9,867) || 24–27-5
|- align="center"
| 57 || 18 || Boston Bruins || 5–6 || The Forum (11,066)|| 24–28–5
|- align="center"
| 58 || 24 || Chicago Black Hawks || 3–3 || The Forum (15,752)|| 24-28–6
|- align="center"
| 59 || 25 || St. Louis Blues || 4–2 || The Forum (7,386)|| 25–28-6
|- align="center"
| 60 || 29 || Philadelphia Flyers || 3–1 || Philadelphia (9,115) || 26–28-6
|-

|- align="center"
| 61 || 2 || Toronto Maple Leafs || 2–5 || Toronto (15,816)|| 26–29–6
|- align="center"
| 62 || 5 || Montreal Canadiens || 2–6 || The Forum (14,450)|| 26–30–6
|- align="center"
| 63 || 7 || Oakland Seals || 9–2 || The Forum (6,678)|| 27–30-6
|- align="center"
| 64 || 9 || Pittsburgh Penguins || 1–3 || Pittsburgh (8,176) || 27–31–6
|- align="center"
| 65 || 10 || New York Rangers || 4–3 || New York (17,250)|| 28–31-6
|- align="center"
| 66 || 12 || Detroit Red Wings || 2–2 || The Forum (10,244)|| 28-31–7
|- align="center"
| 67 || 14 || Philadelphia Flyers || 0–0 || Quebec City (4,116) || 28-31–8
|- align="center"
| 68 || 16 || Minnesota North Stars || 2–1 || Minnesota (13,739)|| 29–31-8
|- align="center"
| 69 || 20 || Minnesota North Stars || 3–3 || The Forum (9,453)|| 29-31–9
|- align="center"
| 70 || 22 || St. Louis Blues || 6–1 || The Forum (8,753)|| 30–31-9
|- align="center"
| 71 || 23 || Philadelphia Flyers || 4–2 || The Forum (14,003) || 31–31-9
|- align="center"
| 72 || 26 || Pittsburgh Penguins || 1–2 || The Forum (7,057) || 31–32–9
|- align="center"
| 73 || 27 || Minnesota North Stars || 3–5 || The Forum (8,559)|| 31–33–9
|- align="center"
| 74 || 30 || Oakland Seals || 2–2 || Oakland (7,055) || 31-33–10
|-

Playoffs

1968 NHL Quarter-finals
Minnesota North Stars vs. Los Angeles Kings

Minnesota wins best-of-seven series 4–3.

Player statistics

Forwards
Note: GP = Games played; G = Goals; A = Assists; Pts = Points; PIM = Penalty minutes

Defencemen
Note: GP = Games played; G = Goals; A = Assists; Pts = Points; PIM = Penalty minutes

Goaltending
Note: GP = Games played; MIN = Minutes; W = Wins; L = Losses; T = Ties; SO = Shutouts; GAA = Goals against average

Awards and records

Records

Individual
March 10, 1968: Fastest two goals, 6 seconds apart, Bill Flett at 9:14 of first period, and Eddie Joyal at 9:20.

Team
Fewest short-handed goals against in season, 3
Most shutouts against in season, 9

Milestones

Transactions
The Kings were involved in the following transactions during the 1967-68 season.

Trades

Draft picks

NHL draft

NOTE: Back before 1979, the amateur draft was held with varying rules and procedures.  In 1967, teams only needed to select as many player as they wanted to, which is why there was only one Kings player drafted.

Expansion draft
 Los Angeles Kings selections

Farm teams
 Springfield Indians (American Hockey League)

Broadcasting
KNX 1070 was the radio broadcaster in all games. KTLA covered 20 of the 37 away games through a simulcast. CBS broadcast nationally the first game at the Forum.

References
 Kings on Hockey Database

Los Angeles Kings seasons
Los
Los
1967 in sports in California
1968 in sports in California